The 1903 Kentucky gubernatorial election was held on November 3, 1903. Incumbent Democrat J. C. W. Beckham defeated Republican nominee Morris B. Belknap with 52.12% of the vote.

General election

Candidates
Major party candidates
J. C. W. Beckham, Democratic
Morris B. Belknap, Republican 

Other candidates
T.P. Demaree, Prohibition
Alfred Schmitz, Socialist Labor
Adam Nagel, Socialist

Results

References

1903
Kentucky
1903 Kentucky elections